Tupinambás Ecological Station is a marine ecological station in and around the Alcatrazes archipelago off the coast in São Paulo State, Brazil.

History

The Tupinambás Ecological Station is a Federal conservation area covering  administered by the Chico Mendes Institute for Biodiversity Conservation.
It was created on 20 July 1987.
It is in the São Sebastião and Ubatuba municipalities of São Paulo State.

Status

As of 2009 the Ecological Station was a "strict nature reserve" under IUCN protected area category Ia.
Migratory species include royal tern (Sterna maxima), spotted sandpiper (Actitis macularia), South American tern (Sterna hirundinacea), white-rumped sandpiper (Calidris fuscicollis), Cape petrel (Daption capense), wandering albatross (Diomedea exulans), Wilson's storm petrel (Oceanites oceanicus), Magellanic penguin (Spheniscus magellanicus), orange-breasted falcon (Falco deiroleucus), ultramarine grosbeak (Passerina brissonii), peregrine falcon (Falco peregrinus), great shearwater (Puffinus gravis), black-browed albatross (Thalassarche melanophris), humpback whale (Megaptera novaeangliae), Bryde's whale (Balaenoptera brydei), common minke whale (Balaenoptera acutorostrata), Atlantic yellow-nosed albatross (Thalassarche chlororhynchos) and giant oceanic manta ray (Manta birostris).

Endemic critically endangered land species include the pit viper Bothrops alcatraz and the frogs Cycloramphus faustoi and Scinax alcatraz.

References

Sources

1987 establishments in Brazil
Ecological stations of Brazil
Protected areas of São Paulo (state)
Protected areas established in 1987